The municipality of Jalacingo is located in the central area of the Mexican state of Veracruz de Ignacio de la Llave, in the region called the Capital, on the border with the state of Puebla, it is one of the state's 212 municipalities. It is located at the coordinates 19°48'N 97°18'W, the city has a height of 1860 meters above sea level, while the height of the municipality varies from 600 to 2900 meters above sea level.

External links 

  Municipal Official Site
  Municipal Official Information

Populated places in Veracruz